Sir Roderic Lionel James Wood (born 8 March 1951), styled The Hon. Mr Justice Wood, is a judge of the High Court of England and Wales.

He was educated at Nottingham High School and Lincoln College, Oxford.

He was called to the bar at Middle Temple in 1974. He was made a QC in 1993, recorder from 1997 to 2002, and judge of the High Court of Justice (Family Division) since 2004.
The Honourable Sir Roderic Wood retires from the High Court (Family Division) with effect from 5 October 2016.

References

1951 births
Living people
People educated at Nottingham High School
Alumni of Lincoln College, Oxford
Members of the Middle Temple
Family Division judges
Knights Bachelor